Jalukbari Assembly constituency is one of the 126 assembly constituencies of Assam state assembly, in north-east India.  It is a segment of Gauhati Lok Sabha constituency.

Himanta Biswa Sarma has won Jalukbari constituency for five consecutive terms, thrice with Indian National Congress and twice with Bharatiya Janata Party.

Members of Legislative Assembly

Election results

2021 result

2016 result

2011

2006

2001 result

See also
 Jalukbari
 List of constituencies of Assam Legislative Assembly

References

External links 
 

Assembly constituencies of Assam